Johann Baptist Wanhal (12 May 1739 – 20 August 1813) was a Czech classical music composer. He was born in Nechanice, Bohemia, and died in Vienna. His music was well respected by Mozart, Haydn, Beethoven and Schubert.  He was an instrumental performer as well.  While being a proficient organist, he also played the violin and cello.

Name

Wanhal and at least one of his publishers used the spelling Waṅhal, the dot being an archaic form of the modern háček. Other attested variants include Wanhall, Vanhal and Van Hall. The modern Czech form Jan Křtitel Vaňhal was introduced in the 20th century.

Biography

Birth and youth in Bohemia: 1739–1760/61 
Wanhal was born in Nechanice, Bohemia, into serfdom in a Czech peasant family. He excelled at the violin and organ from an early age, received his first musical training from his family and local musicians, the organist Anton Erban being one of his most prized mentors. From these humble beginnings he was able to earn a living as a village organist and choirmaster. He was also taught German from an early age, as this was required for someone wishing to make a career in music within the Habsburg empire.

First period in Vienna: 1760/61–1769 
By the age of 21 Wanhal must have been well under way to become a skilled performer and composer, as his patron, the Countess Schaffgotsch, took him to Vienna as part of her personal train in 1760. There he quickly established himself as a teacher of singing, violin and piano to the high nobility, and he was invited to conduct his symphonies for illustrious patrons such as the Erdődy families and Baron Isaac von Riesch of Dresden. During the years 1762–63, he is supposed to have been the student of Carl Ditters von Dittersdorf, even though they were born the same year. Baron Riesch sponsored a trip to Italy in 1769, so that Wanhal could learn the Italian style of composition, which was very much in fashion. To return the favour, Wanhal was supposed to become Riesch's Kapellmeister.

Journey to Italy: 1769–1771 
The details of Wanhal's journey to Italy are scant, but it is known that he met his fellow Bohemians Gluck and Florian Gassmann in Venice and Rome respectively. The Italian journeys present the only knowledge we have of Wanhal writing operas: He is supposed either to have written operas over the Metastasian operas Il Trionfo di Clelia and Demofonte, either by himself, or as a cooperation with Gassmann, where Wanhal supplied some or all of the arias; these works have been lost. In additions to his documented travels in northern and central Italy, Wanhal was supposed to travel to Naples – arguably the most important centre of music in Italy at the time – but never seems to have arrived there.

Vienna and Varaždin: 1771–1780 
After his journey to Italy, Wanhal returned to Vienna rather than to go to Riesch in Dresden. Claims have been made that Wanhal became heavily depressed or even insane, but these claims are likely to have been overstated. During this period he is supposed to have acted occasionally as a de facto Kapellmeister for Count Erdődy in Varaždin, although the small number of compositions by him remaining there suggests that this was not the full-time role that would have been expected if he had worked with Riesch; Vanhal might have preferred such employment with the Count precisely because of its part-time nature. There is no evidence of visits after 1779.

Return to Vienna and final years: 1780–1813 
Around 1780, Wanhal stopped writing symphonies and string quartets, focusing instead on music for piano and small-scale chamber ensembles, masses and other church music. The former, written for a growing middle class, supplied him with the means to live a modest, economically independent life; for the last 30 years of his life he did not work under any patron, probably being the first Viennese composer to do so. During these years, more than 270 of his works were published by Viennese printers. In the 1780s he was still an active participant in Viennese musical life. In 1782 he met Mozart, who admired Wanhal's Symphonies. He enjoyed playing music with Mozart and some of his friends who were composers, as testified in Michael Kelly's account of the string quartet Wanhal played in together with Haydn, Mozart and Dittersdorf in 1784. After 1787 or so, however, he seems to have ceased performing in public, but he nevertheless was economically secure, living in good quarters near St. Stephen's Cathedral. He died without heirs  in 1813, an elderly composer whose music was still recognized by the Viennese public.

Style 

Wanhal had to be a prolific writer to meet the demands made upon him, and attributed to him are 100 quartets, at least 73 symphonies, 95 sacred works, and a large number of instrumental and vocal works. The symphonies, in particular, have been committed increasingly often to compact disc in recent times, and the best of them are comparable with many of Haydn's. Many of Wanhal's symphonies are in minor keys and are considered highly influential to the "Sturm und Drang" movement of his time. "[Wanhal] makes use of repeated semiquavers, pounding quavers in the bass line, wide skips in the themes, sudden pauses (fermatas), silences, exaggerated dynamic marks ... and all these features ... appear in Mozart's first large-scale Sturm und Drang symphony, no. 25 in g minor (K. 183) of 1773." This kind of style also appears in Joseph Haydn's Symphony No. 83 in g minor, The Hen (1785), and
Muzio Clementi's Sonata in g minor, Op.34, No.2 (circa 1795).

Around 1780 Wanhal seems to have stopped writing large-scale instrumental music, and rather contented himself with writing piano music for the growing middle class, and church music. In the former category his programmatic pieces, often related to recent events such as "the Battle of Würzburg", "the Battle of Abukir", and "the Return of Francis II in 1809". Judging from the number of extant manuscripts available, these works must have been highly popular.
Wanhal was also the most prolific writer of Masses and other Catholic church music of his generation in Vienna. Despite this, it appears that he was never in the employ of any religious institution. This means that his late Masses are both testaments to a genuine personal faith, and evidence of how lucrative his focus on incidental piano music must have been.

Robert O. Gjerdingen sees a change in Wanhal's style as he redirected his attention towards the middle class, his music becoming didactic in the sense that it employed musical figures in a clear and self-referential manner, rather than the seamless continuity from figure to figure that had characterized his earlier pieces. In this, Gjerdingen sees Wanhal as prefiguring Beethoven.

Such was his success that within a few years of his symphonies being written, they were being performed around the world, and as far distant as the United States. In later life, however, he rarely moved from Vienna, where he was also an active teacher.

References

Further reading

External links 

 www.wanhal.org the Johann Baptist Wanhal Association
 Duke University website
 Dr. Paul Bryan: Thematic Catalog of Wanhal's music.
 www.klassika.info/Komponisten/Vanhal/wv_gattung.html
 www.klassika.info/Komponisten/Vanhal/index.html
 Johann Baptist Wanhal (Vanhal) on NAXOS.com
 
 www.classical-composers.org/comp/vanhal
 Wanhal works at Artaria Editions

Scores
 Works by Wanhal at the Mutopia project
 

1739 births
1813 deaths
People from Nechanice
18th-century Bohemian musicians
Czech Classical-period composers
Czech male classical composers
Czech opera composers
Male opera composers
Czech expatriates in Austria
String quartet composers
19th-century Czech male musicians